Crider is a soil series and the state soil of Kentucky.

Description 
The Natural Resources Conservation Service describes Crider as a soil series with "very deep, well drained, moderately permeable soils on uplands. They formed in a mantle of loess and the underlying limestone residuum." It is known to be present in Kentucky, Indiana, Illinois, Missouri, Ohio, and Tennessee. The soil is a considered highly productive agricultural soil, such that much of Kentucky's land with Crider soil is used for farming.

State soil 
In 1990, Crider was named the state soil of Kentucky. It is present in 35 counties in the state, most extensively in the Pennyroyal Plateau.

References 

Pedology
Soil in the United States
Geology of Kentucky
Symbols of Kentucky
Types of soil